Himalayan may refer to:

 Himalayas mountain range
 Transhimalaya, a subrange (some species found there are referred to as "Himalayan" not "Transhimalayan")
 Himalayan (album), an album by the band Band of Skulls
 Himalayan cat, the breed of domesticated cat
 Himalayan guinea pig, a coloration pattern in the domesticated guinea pig (cavy)
 Himalayan rabbit, the breed of rabbit
 The Himalayans (band), a Nepali band
 The Himalayans (American band)

See also
 Himalaya (disambiguation)